In the run-up to the 2023 Finnish parliamentary election, various organisations will carry out opinion polling to gauge voting intentions in Finland. Results of such polls are displayed in this list.

The date range for these opinion polls are from the 2019 Finnish parliamentary election, held on 14 April, to the present day. The next election will be held on 2 April 2023.

Opinion polls

Graphical summary

Vote share

First time voters poll

By electoral district

Helsinki

Häme

Kaakkois-Suomi

Keski-Suomi

Pirkanmaa

Satakunta

Savo-Karjala

Uusimaa

Varsinais-Suomi

See also 
Opinion polling for the 2019 Finnish parliamentary election
Opinion polling for the 2015 Finnish parliamentary election

Notes

References 

Next
Finland